Ocee was a small community in Milton County, now located in Johns Creek in Fulton County, Georgia.

It was originally called New York, then Mazeppa.  The Ocee name, which was taken from the name of a Cherokee community in the area, is still in use today for a school, a park, a library and a church, among others.  Ocee is now a part of the new city of Johns Creek, named after Johns Creek which flows just east of it.  That city is a part of the municipalization of northern Fulton.

Geography of Fulton County, Georgia